Gray Matter was an American post-hardcore band from Washington, D.C., United States, who played in the 1980s and 1990s.  They disbanded in 1986, but reformed in 1990.

Biography 
Gray Matter officially formed in the summer of 1983 from the ashes of several Washington, D.C. area punk bands. Geoff Turner, Mark Haggerty and Dante Ferrando had been playing in bands since their early junior high school days. In 1983, Dante and Mark were playing in Iron Cross, but when the band's image began to reflect its violent supporters more than the members themselves, Dante quit. Soon after Mark also left and the two reunited with Geoff and Steve Niles and started playing shows around Washington D.C. as Gray Matter.

The band's first album, Food For Thought, was recorded at Inner Ear studio in November 1984 with Minor Threat's Ian Mackaye assisting with production. It was originally released on R&B Records in 1985, while the members were still in high school. In 1986, Dischord Records released the EP Take It Back. Shortly thereafter, Mark left the band to go to college and Gray Matter broke up. Dante went on to play drums for Ignition and Geoff, Steve, and Mark reunited and formed the band Three, with Jeff Nelson from Minor Threat. Gray Matter reformed in the spring of 1990 and released a double seven inch in 1991 and the full-length, Thog, in 1992. The band officially disbanded in 1993.

Dischord originally re-issued Food For Thought and Take It Back (DIS 49) onto one CD in 1990.

On September 21, 2003, the band reunited for a one off show to celebrate to 10th anniversary of the Black Cat, a nightclub in Washington D.C. that's partially owned by band member Dante Ferrando. Subsequently, Gray Matter has performed at the Black Cat's 15th, 20th, and 25th anniversary shows.

Members
Geoff Turner - vocals, guitar
Steve Niles - bass, vocals
Mark Haggerty - guitar
Dante Ferrando - drums

Before Gray Matter, Haggerty and Ferrando played in the DC skinhead band Iron Cross. Niles later gained fame for writing horror comics books, in particular 30 Days of Night. Geoff Turner went on to found WGNS recording studios, and Dante Ferrando is the founder and owner of long running D.C. alternative and punk nightclub the Black Cat.

Discography

Albums
 Food for Thought (R&B Records 1985, Dischord Records 1990)
 Thog (Dischord Records 1992)

EPs and singles
 Take It Back 12-inch (Dischord Records 1986)
 4 Songs 2×7″ (Dischord/WGNS Recordings 1991)
 Second Guess split 7-inch with Severin (Dischord/Superbad Records 1992)

Compilations
 Food for Thought/Take It Back (1990)

Compilation appearances
 Alive and Kicking 7-inch (WGNS Recordings 1985)
 20 Years of Dischord (2002) - "Oscar's Eye"

Covers
 "I Am the Walrus" - The Beatles
 "I've Just Seen a Face" - The Beatles

References

External links
 Gray Matter Profile by Dischord Records
 Myspace Site
 Gray Matter Profile by Southern Records
 GrayMatter, a charity of the same name!

American emo musical groups
Dischord Records artists
First-wave emo bands
Musical groups established in 1983
Musical groups disestablished in 1993
Hardcore punk groups from Washington, D.C.